Ten Year Night is the third solo album by American singer-songwriter Lucy Kaplansky, released in 1999.

Track listing 
All songs by Lucy Kaplansky and Richard Litvin unless otherwise noted.
 "Written on the Back of His Hand" – 4:37
 "Ten Year Night" – 5:10
 "End of the Day" – 4:07
 "One Good Reason" – 3:06
 "Five in the Morning" – 4:05
 "Promise Me" – 5:20
 "Turn the Lights Back On" – 3:47
 "Just You Tonight" – 4:00
 "For Once in Your Life" – 4:13
 "Somewhere Out There" (Steve Earle) – 3:16
 "A Child's Hands" – 5:16

Personnel
Lucy Kaplansky – vocals, guitar, background vocals
Duke Levine – guitar, slide guitar
Larry Campbell – guitar, fiddle, mandolin, pedal steel guitar, slide guitar
Jon Herington – guitar, slide guitar, Harmonium
Zev Katz – bass, baritone guitar
Jennifer Kimball – background vocals
John Gorka – background vocals
Richard Shindell – background vocals
Ben Wittman – organ, drums, percussion
Production notes:
Ben Wittman – producer, engineer
Hillary Johnson – engineer
James Tuttle	 – engineer
Alan Williams – engineer
Ben Wisch – mixing
Grace Falconer – assistant engineer
David Glasser – mastering
C. Taylor Crothers – photography

References 

1999 albums
Lucy Kaplansky albums
Red House Records albums